Sail a Crooked Ship is a 1961 American black-and-white comedy heist film starring Robert Wagner, Dolores Hart, Carolyn Jones, Frankie Avalon, Ernie Kovacs and Frank Gorshin. It was directed by Irving Brecher and was based on the 1960 novel of the same name by Nathaniel Benchley.

Sail a Crooked Ship was Kovacs' last movie, released shortly before he was killed in a car crash.

Hart's other 1961 film, Francis of Assisi, inspired her to retire from acting two years later and become a Roman Catholic nun.

Plot
When Gilbert Barrows (Robert Wagner) disobeys his boss and tries to refit an old Liberty Ship for cargo use instead of scrapping it, he inadvertently puts it into the hands of a colorful group of crooks led by good-hearted screw-up Bugsy G. Fogelmeyer (Ernie Kovacs) and brainy sociopath George M. Wilson (Frank Gorshin). The crooks plan to use the ship to make their getaway after they pull a bank robbery in Boston, and they kidnap Barrows and his girlfriend Elinor Harrison (Dolores Hart) – his boss's daughter – to prevent leaving any witnesses behind.  With the help of Bugsy's nephew Rodney J. Fogelmeyer (Frankie Avalon), Gilbert and Elinor manage to foil the crooks' plans by using Elinor's bra as a slingshot and attracting the Coast Guard.

Cast
Robert Wagner as Gilbert Barrows
Dolores Hart as Elinor Harrison
Carolyn Jones as Virginia
Ernie Kovacs as Bugsy G. Foglemeyer alias "The Captain"
Frankie Avalon as Ensign Rodney J. Foglemeyer
Frank Gorshin as George M. Wilson
Jesse White as McDonald
Harvey Lembeck as Nickels
Sid Tomack as Sammy
Guy Raymond as Helmut
Buck Kartalian as Finster
Wilton Graff as Simon J. Harrison
Marjorie Bennett as Mrs. Chowder

Production
The film was based on a novel published in 1960. The New York Times called it "slightly daffy".

Producer Philip Barry thought the novel would make a good film. He pitched it to MGM for whom he had made The Mating Game but that studio passed. Barry went on to sign a three picture deal at Columbia Studios. In June 1960 Barry said his first film for Columbia would be Sail a Crooked Ship which he described as "Some Like It Hot without drag". He hoped to star Jack Lemmon and hired William Bowers to write the script.

"I can't remember how many opinions were brought to bear on the script," said Barry later. "The ship has changed course quite a few times since I read the book."

In January 1961 Ernie Kovacs was cast. Also that month Columbia announced the lead role would be played by Robert Wagner. He and then-wife Natalie Wood formed their own company, Rona Productions, which signed a three picture deal with Columbia for Wagner's services. The first film was Sail a Crooked Ship and the second would be The Interns. Wagner would get a percentage of the profits. (In the end, Wagner's marriage to Wood ended in 1961 and he only made the one film for Columbia).

In March it was announced the female leads would be Joan Collins and Jean Seberg. These roles would end up being played by Carolyn Jones and Dolores Hart.

Following the hijacking of the Portuguese ship Santa Maria the studio briefly considered renaming the film Steal a Crooked Ship to cash in.

Barry wanted further work on the script but Bowers was on another project, so he hired other writers. (Bowers ended up not being credited at all.) Filming started April 1961 without a completed script. Barry said during the shoot, "basically we are in the same position as a play in New Haven with a third act that needs work before it gets to Broadway."

See also
 List of American films of 1961

References
Notes

External links

1961 comedy films
1960s heist films
1961 films
American black-and-white films
American comedy films
American heist films
Columbia Pictures films
Films based on American novels
Films based on works by Nathaniel Benchley
Films directed by Irving Brecher
Films scored by George Duning
Seafaring films
1960s English-language films
1960s American films